Adam Smith-Neale (born 29 October 1993) is an English professional darts player.

Darts career

Early career
Smith-Neale started playing in the PDC at the age of 17 in 2011 when he entered the World Youth Championships and lost in the last 64 to Lewis Venes. The following January Smith-Neale entered Q School and after making the last 16 all four days he was given a two-year tour card to play the Pro tour. Through those 2 years Smith-Neale split his time between playing on the main tour and on the Youth tour, on the main tour he failed to make an impact and only made one TV major which was the 2012 UK Open where he made the last 96. On the Youth tour however Smith-Neale had much more success where he managed to finish the 2011 season 9th in the Rankings which qualified him for the 2012 PDC World Youth Championship where he again went out at the last 64 stage.

In 2012 Smith-Neale won his first PDC tournament when he won Event 7 of the Youth tour  and finished the season in 14th qualifying for the 2013 PDC World Youth Championship where he went out in the first round.

After not making the top 64 of the PDC Order of Merit by the end of 2012, Smith-Neale lost his tour card and went to Q-School again. He failed to gain a tour card in 2013, 14, 15, 17, but continued to play on the Challenge Tour and Development Tour during that time.

2018 season
After failing to get a Tour Card at the start of the 2018 season, Smith-Neale started to play in more BDO events which lead him to qualify for the BDO World Masters. Not being a seed meant that he had to start the tournament at the first round but Smith-Neale won through the first 6 rounds on the floor to reach the stage finals. He defeated Aaron Turner 3-1 in the last 48, Daniel Day 3-0 in the last 32, Mark McGeeney 3-2 in the last 16, Wayne Warren 4-1 in the quarter-finals, Jim Williams 5-3 in the semi-final and BDO Number 1 Glen Durrant 6-4 in the final. Winning the World Masters meant Smith-Neale qualified for the 2019 BDO World Championship, and the 2018 Grand Slam of Darts.

2019
Prior to the 2019 BDO World Darts Championship, Smith-Neale suffered a broken leg in a fall following a tournament in Italy, with Smith-Neale admitting he was inebriated before the fall. He managed to play his preliminary round match, but did so on crutches, using both during his walk-on and using his right crutch while throwing his darts. He was beaten 3–0 by New Zealand's Mark McGrath.

2023-present
He regained his tour card in 2023 after defeating Nick Kenny in the final on the last day of Q School, and will play on the PDC circuit for the 2023 and 2024 seasons.

World Championship results

BDO

 2019: Preliminary round (lost to Mark McGrath 0–3)
 2020: First round (lost to Paul Hogan 0–3)

Career finals

BDO major finals: 1 (1 titles)

References

External links

1993 births
Living people
British Darts Organisation players
Professional Darts Corporation current tour card holders
Sportspeople from Coventry
English darts players